Dysoptus probata is a species of moth in the family Arrhenophanidae. It is known only from the type locality in south-western Guatemala.

The length of the forewings is about 8 mm for females.

External links
Family Arrhenophanidae

Dysoptus
Moths described in 1914